Al Ahly Women's Volleyball Club is a part of Al Ahly SC club, which represents the club in Egypt and in major international volleyball competitions. The club has been based in Cairo since the 1940s.

The club broke many records and is the most crowned team in Egypt with a total of 64 titles including 34 league titles and 30 Egyptian Cups. Additionally, the club holds a record in Africa as the most crowned team with eight African Champions Cups and eight African Winners Cup internationally. The club is the only team to surpass 30 domestic titles and 30 domestic cups.

Honours

National achievements 

Egyptian League :
   Winners  38 titles (Record)

Egyptian Cup:

   Winners  35 titles (Record)

International achievements 

 Women's African Clubs Championship : 10

 Winners 10 titles (Record) : 1990, 1999, 2000, 2003, 2007, 2009, 2015, 2016, 2018, 2019

 Runners-Up ( 7 vice champions) :1987, 1988, 1989, 1997, 2001, 2005, 2006

Women's African Clubs Championship Cup Winners

 Winners 8 titles (Record) :1989, 1990, 1991, 1993, 1995, 1996, 1998, 1999

 Runners-Up ( 2 vice champions) : 1993 - 1997

Regional achievements 

Women's Arab Clubs Championship : 8
 Winners 8 titles Record : 1998, 1999, 2000, 2005, 2007, 2009, 2016, 2017

 Runners-Up ( 1 vice champions) : 2019

Sports Hall information
 

Name: – Al Ahly Sports Hall
City: – Cairo
Capacity: – 2500

Current squad

Transfers

Transfers for the 2019-20 season

Joining
  Doaa Elghobashy from  Elshams SC 
  Paula mohr from  Itajaí Vôlei Embraed

Leaving
  ekaterina silchenkova
  Nirmeen Elmenshawy
  Noor Yassin

Transfers for the 2018-19 season

Joining
  Doaa Mohamed from  zamalek SC 
  Sara Amin from  Shams SC

Leaving
 none

Transfers for the 2017-18 season

Joining
  ekaterina silchenkova  
  Violet Makuto (2 weeks loan at Arab championship)

Leaving
  Ingy El shami Retire

Technical and managerial staff

Kit manufacturers and shirt sponsors

Notable players 

  Tahany Toson
  Hannaa Hamza
  Sara Talaat
  Shrihan Sameh
  Mona abdel karem

Club Presidents

See also
 Al Ahly FC
 Al Ahly (volleyball)
 Al Ahly Women's Volleyball
 Al Ahly (basketball)
 Al Ahly Women's Basketball
 Al Ahly (handball)
 Al Ahly Women's Handball
 Al Ahly (table tennis)
 Al Ahly (water polo)
 Port Said Stadium riot
 Al-Ahly TV

References

External links
 Al Ahly website
 Al Ahly Volleyball on facebook
 Al Ahly Volleyball on Twitter
 Fan website
Fan page

V
Egyptian volleyball clubs
Volleyball clubs established in 1940
1940 establishments in Egypt